Toshiyuki "Toshi" Hiruma（比留間 敏之） is a film producer, who has produced Batman: Gotham Knight, The Batman, Kangaroo Jack: G'Day U.S.A.!, Daffy Duck for President, Justice League and What's New, Scooby-Doo?. He directed many animated movies in the 1990s with fellow director Takashi Masunaga for Jetlag Productions.

TV Series
Lupin the 3rd Part II (1979)
The New Adventures of Gigantor (1980)
Jarinko Chie (1981)
Inspector Gadget (1983) - TMS Entertainment/Telecom Animation Film、K.K. DIC
Rainbow Brite (1984) - TMS Entertainment/Telecom Animation Film、K.K. DIC
Heathcliff and the Catillac Cats (1984) - TMS Entertainment/Telecom Animation Film、K.K. DIC
Galaxy High School (1986) - TMS Entertainment/Telecom Animation Film
Bionic Six (1987) - TMS Entertainment/Telecom Animation Film
Fox's Peter Pan & the Pirates (1990) - TMS Entertainment/Telecom Animation Film
King Arthur and the Knights of Justice (1992)
The Adventures of T-Rex (1992)
The Bots Master (1993)
Project G.e.e.K.e.R. (1996) - Hanho Heung-Up
Extreme Ghostbusters (1997) - Koko Enterprises
Men in Black: The Series (1997) - Mook、Koko Enterprises
Channel Umptee-3 (1997) - Koko Enterprises
Godzilla: The Series (1998) - DR Movie、Dong Woo Animation、Koko、Lotto、New Millennium、Samwon
Dragon Tales (1999 Season1) - Big Star、Dongwoo、Lotto、Sunwoo、Wang Film、Yearim、Yeson
Big Guy and Rusty the Boy Robot (1999) - DR Movie、Dong Woo Animation、Koko Enterprises、Lotto Animation、Samwon
Jackie Chan Adventures (2000 Season1) - Dong Woo Animation、Rough Draft Korea

Movie
Lupin III: The Castle of Cagliostro (1979)
Chie the Brat (1981)
SANSHIRO (1981※TV Movie)
Ohayō! Spank (1982)

Video
Cinderella (? 1994)
Leo the Lion: King of the Jungle (20 July 1994)
Pocahontas (19 October 1994)
Snow White (27 April 1995)
Alice in Wonderland (31 July 1995)
Little Red Riding Hood (31 July 1995)

External links
 

Year of birth missing (living people)
Living people
American film producers
Place of birth missing (living people)